Desislava or Dessislava is a feminine Bulgarian given name. Notable people with the name include:

Desislava Bozhilova (born 1992), Bulgarian international snooker referee
Desislava of Bulgaria (fl. 14th c.), Princess of Bulgaria during the Second Bulgarian Empire
Desislava (fl. 13th c.), Bulgarian noble of the second Bulgarian Empire
Desislava Aleksandrova-Mladenova (born 1975), Bulgarian high jumper
Desislava Balabanova (born 1988), Bulgarian sport shooter
Desislava Doneva (born 1979), Bulgarian singer known mononymously as Desi Slava
Dessislava Mladenova (born 1988), Bulgarian tennis player
Dessislava Nikodimova (born 1966), Bulgarian volleyball player
Desislava Petrova (born 1980), Bulgarian gay rights activist
Dessislava Roussanova, Bulgarian journalist
Desislava Stoyanova (born 1992), Bulgarian biathlete
Desislava Topalova (born 1978), Bulgarian tennis player
Desislava Taneva (born 1972), Bulgarian politician
Dessislava Velitchkova (born 1972), Bulgarian volleyball player
Desislava Radeva (born 1969), First Lady of Bulgaria

See also
Desislav, male variant of the name
Desislava Cove, a cove of Antarctica

Bulgarian feminine given names